Charles Angélique François Huchet, Comte de la Bédoyère (17 April 1786 – 19 August 1815) was a French General during the reign of Emperor Napoleon I who was executed in 1815.

Biography
Descended from an old Breton family, he entered the army in late 1806 as a Second Lieutenant, serving as an aide-de-camp to Marshal Lannes and then Prince Eugene. Comte de la Bédoyère saw active service in Spain, Italy, Germany, Russia and France, and was awarded the Legion of Honour and the Iron Crown. He was a Colonel commanding the 7th Regiment of the Line at Grenoble when Napoleon returned from exile in Elba and marched north to Paris. On 8 March, la Bédoyère and his regiment went over to Napoleon en masse.

During the Waterloo campaign de la Bédoyère, now promoted to General de Brigade and an aide-de-camp of the Emperor, was probably the officer sent with a message to d'Erlon's I Corps, then marching west to join Ney at Quatre Bras, to turn east to support the Emperor at Ligny. Ney was furious when he learned the corps was marching away from his battle and sent another order for it to return immediately to Quatre-Bras. As a result of these orders and counter-orders, d'Erlon's 20,000 men, which could have sealed the fate of the Anglo-Dutch at Quatre-Bras or the Prussians at Ligny, spent the entire day marching back and forth without firing a shot.

Two days later at the Battle of Waterloo, de la Bédoyère was one of the last to leave the battlefield. Afterward, finding that he was not eligible for amnesty as he believed, he secretly travelled to Paris in order to see his wife before heading to Switzerland and exile, but was recognized and arrested. La Bédoyère was tried by a military court and condemned to death by firing squad, and this was confirmed and carried out at the plain of Grenelle on 19 August 1815.

Charles Huchet de la Bédoyère rests in the Père Lachaise Cemetery in Paris.  Napoleon's will of 1815 left money for his children, later added to by a codicil.

See also
Michael de la Bédoyère
Guy de la Bédoyère

References

External links
 French Generals

1786 births
1815 deaths
Military personnel from Paris
French generals
Burials at Père Lachaise Cemetery
People executed by France by firing squad
People executed by the Bourbon dynasty of the Kingdom of France
French military personnel of the Napoleonic Wars
Members of the Chamber of Peers of the Hundred Days
Executed people from Île-de-France